Paul Langevin  (23 January 1872 – 19 December 1946) was a French physicist who developed Langevin dynamics and the Langevin equation. He was one of the founders of the Comité de vigilance des intellectuels antifascistes, an anti-fascist organization created after the 6 February 1934 far right riots. Being a public opponent of fascism in the 1930s resulted in his arrest and being held under house arrest by the Vichy government for most of World War II. Langevin was also president of the Human Rights League (LDH) from 1944 to 1946, having recently joined the French Communist Party.

He was a doctoral student of Pierre Curie and later a lover of widowed Marie Curie. He is also known for his two US patents with Constantin Chilowsky in 1916 and 1917 involving ultrasonic submarine detection. He is entombed at the Panthéon.

Life 
Langevin was born in Paris, and studied at the École de Physique et Chimie and the École Normale Supérieure. He then went to the University of Cambridge and studied in the Cavendish Laboratory under  Sir J. J. Thomson. Langevin returned to the Sorbonne and obtained his PhD from Pierre Curie in 1902. In 1904, he became Professor of Physics at the Collège de France. In 1926, he became director of the École de Physique et Chimie (later became École supérieure de physique et de chimie industrielles de la Ville de Paris, ESPCI ParisTech), where he had been educated. He was elected in 1934 to the Académie des sciences.

Langevin is noted for his work on paramagnetism and diamagnetism, and devised the modern interpretation of this phenomenon in terms of spins of electrons within atoms. His most famous work was in the use of ultrasound using Pierre Curie's piezoelectric effect. During World War I, he began working on the use of these sounds to detect submarines through echo location. However the war was over by the time it was operational. During his career, Paul Langevin also spread the theory of relativity in academic circles in France and created what is now called the twin paradox.

In 1898, he married Emma Jeanne Desfosses, and together they had four children, Jean, André, Madeleine and Hélène.

In 1910, he reportedly had an affair with the then-widowed Marie Curie; some decades later, their respective grandchildren, grandson Michel Langevin and granddaughter Hélène Langevin-Joliot married one another. He was also noted for being an outspoken opponent of Nazism, and was removed from his post by the Vichy government following the occupation of the country by Nazi Germany. He was later restored to his position in 1944. He died in Paris in 1946, two years after living to see the Liberation of Paris. He is buried near several other prominent French scientists in the Panthéon in Paris.

In 1933, he had a son with physicist Eliane Montel (1898-1993), Paul-Gilbert Langevin, who became a renowned musicologist.

His daughter, Hélène Solomon-Langevin, was arrested for Resistance activity and survived several concentration camps. She was on the same convoy of female political prisoners as Marie-Claude Vaillant-Couturier and Charlotte Delbo.

Submarine detection 
In 1916 and 1917, Paul Langevin and Chilowsky filed two US patents disclosing the first ultrasonic submarine detector using an electrostatic method (singing condenser) for one patent and thin quartz crystals for the other. The amount of time taken by the signal to travel to the enemy submarine and echo back to the ship on which the device was mounted was used to calculate the distance under water.

In 1916, Lord Ernest Rutherford, working in the UK with his former McGill University PhD student Robert William Boyle, revealed that they were developing a quartz piezoelectric detector for submarine detection. Langevin's successful application of the use of piezoelectricity in the generation and detection of ultrasound waves was followed by further development.

See also 
 Born coordinates, for the Langevin observers in relativistic physics
 Langevin dynamics
 Langevin equation
 Langevin function
 Brillouin and Langevin functions
 Solvay Conference
 Brownian motion
 Special relativity
 Institut Laue–Langevin

References

Sources 

Asimov's Biographical Encyclopedia of Science and Technology, Isaac Asimov, Doubleday & Co., Inc., 1972, .
 References to the affair with Marie Curie is found in Françoise Giroud (Davis, Lydia trans.), Marie Curie: A life, Holmes and Meier, 1986, and in Quinn Susan, Marie Curie: A Life, Heinemann, 1995, .
Wolfram research biographical entry by Michel Barran.
Annotated bibliography for Niels Bohr from the Alsos Digital Library for Nuclear Issues

Further reading

External links

1872 births
1946 deaths
École Normale Supérieure alumni
Members of the French Academy of Sciences
University of Paris alumni
Academic staff of the Collège de France
French activists
French Communist Party members
French physicists
Burials at the Panthéon, Paris
Recipients of the Copley Medal
ESPCI Paris alumni
Academic staff of ESPCI Paris
Alumni of the University of Cambridge
Foreign Members of the Royal Society
Corresponding Members of the Russian Academy of Sciences (1917–1925)
Corresponding Members of the USSR Academy of Sciences
Honorary Members of the USSR Academy of Sciences
Langevin family